Rock Urbano (Spanish for Urban Rock) is a Hard Rock movement developed at late 1970s in Spain. Influenced by hard rock acts like Led Zeppelin or Deep Purple and early Punk Rock bands such as Ramones or The Clash, their lyrics deal about social and marginal problems. Thus, in groups like Leño were influenced by hard rock and blues rock, in others as Barricada, the heavy metal and punk, while in groups like Extremoduro and Marea performs a rock with poetic lyrics, however, they retain the rawness that distinguished the style. Besides, in bands such as Fito & Fitipaldis or Albertucho there are included a mixture of musical influences.
The phenomenon arises in the 1970s, with bands like Burning, Asphalt, Topo and, above all, Leño. These bands started to differentiate from the rest of the other because of their lyrics deal. In the following years, some of the leading Rock Urbano acts were Barricada, Los Suaves, Extremoduro, Platero y Tú, Reincidentes or Rosendo.

Notable urban rock bands:

70s: Leño, Asfalto, Topo, Burning
80s: Los Suaves, Barricada, Rosendo, Leize
90s: Extremoduro, Platero y Tú, Reincidentes, The Flying Rebollos, Quijotes Urbanos,  Porretas, Desastre, Canallas, Transfer, Kalean
00s: La Fuga, Marea, Fito & Fitipaldis, Poncho K, Albertucho, Sínkope, Mala Reputación, Tensa Espera..., Silencio Absoluto, Diagnóstico Canalla.

In various Latin American countries similar movements exist. For example, in Mexico City there is a large Rock Urbano scene with bands such as El Tri, Interpuesto (Historia de un Minuto), El Haragán (A esa gran velocidad), Hazel, Banda Bostik, Sam Sam, Heavy Nopal, Perro Callejero and Barrio Pobre. Urban poet / singer-songwriter Rodrigo (Rockdrigo) González is considered one of the most important forefathers of the current Rock urbano bands in Mexico, he died during the September 19, 1985 earthquake in Mexico City; González bequeathed rock urban hymns such as Metro Balderas.

References
Rock urbano definition
Babas, Kike & Turrón, Kike; Maneras de vivir: Leño y el origen del rock urbano, Impresionarte, 2013, 
Granados, Chema; La calle no calla!!, Quarentena Ediciones, 2009 

Spanish music
Rock music genres